The Mount Washington Wilderness is a wilderness area located on and around Mount Washington in the central Cascade Range of Oregon in the United States.  The wilderness was established in 1964 and comprises  of the Willamette National Forest and Deschutes National Forest. It is administered by the U.S. Forest Service.

Geography 
Mount Washington is a shield volcano rising above  of lava-strewn plains.  The wilderness includes Belknap Crater, a  cinder and ash volcanic cone.  Vegetation consists primarily of lodgepole pine, other species of pine, and mountain hemlock.  There are 28 lakes in the wilderness.  The Pacific Crest National Scenic Trail extends for  through the Mount Washington Wilderness.  It is the primary trail and extends from the north boundary near Big Lake to where it leaves the wilderness at its southern boundary near the Dee Wright Observatory.

Ecology 

Described by Wuerthner (2003) as a "rocks and ice wilderness," much of the Mount Washington Wilderness consists of lava flows and rubble. However, it does include some forested areas with stands of lodgepole pine, and there are 28 lakes in the northern and southwestern parts of the space. Vegetation in the Mount Washington Wilderness includes mountain hemlock, lodgepole pine, ponderosa pine, and whitebark pine. Ponderosa pine occurs at the eastern base of the volcano, with Douglas fir on the western side. On rough surfaces covered with lava, vegetation is less common, but there are some flows, including young lava flows, with trees growing on them. Mountain hemlock also grows on lava flows, and there is an understory of beargrass, huckleberry, and rhododendron. Animal life includes large animals such as deer and elk, with the rare American black bear or cougar. There are small animals in the Mount Washington Wilderness like pikas, marmots, martens, snowshoe hares, and ground squirrels. Lakes in the wilderness sustain populations of brook trout, cutthroat trout, and rainbow trout, and frogs can be observed around some of them.

Recreation 

The Mount Washington Wilderness lies near the Willamette Valley, which is heavily populated. While the area is not used as frequently as many other wilderness areas in the Oregon branch of the Cascade Range, it offers scenic lakes and trails. These include volcanic features such as lava flows from Mount Washington and Belknap Crater. Permits have been required for visitors since 1991; they are offered for no charge after Memorial Day through October 31. Motorized and mechanical equipment like drones or bicycles are prohibited. Visitation to the wilderness has declined since the mid-1990s but leveled off after the B&B Complex fires in 2003. Surveys suggest that about 50 percent of visitors to the Mount Washington Wilderness do not make campfires, a lower rate than other nearby wilderness areas. Additional surveys suggest that about 82 percent of respondents who come to the wilderness area to camp do so within  of a lake.

There are forest roads which extend to the base of Mount Washington. The Pacific Crest Trail is the major path through the Mount Washington Wilderness, extending  from the northern to southern edge of the area. Traversing lodgepole pine forest and lava flows, the trail passes over the western side of Mount Washington. Other trails include a loop around the Patjens Lakes, the Hand Lake trail, and the Benson Lake route. Water is abundant along the route, which passes through lodgepole pine forests with the occasional meadow. One of the trails within the wilderness area, known as the Dry Creek Trail, is not maintained by the United States Forest Service and is no longer recommended as a hiking route due to fallen trees in fire-damaged forest. The U.S. National Geodetic Survey Data Sheet for Mount Washington notes that climbing the volcano is challenging and dangerous and thus is not recommended for inexperienced climbers or climbers without proper equipment.

Mineral and geothermal potential 
A mineral survey from 1980 through 1981 detected little potential for metallic mineral or fossil fuel resources in the Mount Washington Wilderness. The volcanic vents throughout the Mount Washington Wilderness are underlain by Eocene to Pliocene volcanic rock layers, which do not contain hydrocarbons for fossil fuels. While there is relatively little potential for geothermal energy in the High Cascades, there are hot springs along the western edge of the mountain range. The Mount Washington Wilderness has unknown geothermal potential as there have been few holes deep enough to assess its geothermal resources. Silicic bodies of intrusive rock are typically greater in size than more mafic rock in shallow crust, but geologically young, silicic rock does not occur within the Washington wilderness area.

See also 
 List of Oregon Wildernesses
 List of U.S. Wilderness Areas
 Wilderness Act

References

External links 
 
 Mount Washington Wilderness - Willamette National Forest, U.S. Forest Service

Cascade Range
Protected areas of Deschutes County, Oregon
Protected areas of Lane County, Oregon
Protected areas of Linn County, Oregon
Wilderness areas of Oregon
Willamette National Forest
Deschutes National Forest
1964 establishments in Oregon
Protected areas established in 1964